Teldenia apata is a moth in the family Drepanidae. It was described by Wilkinson in 1967. It is found in New Ireland, New Britain, Rook Island and New Hanover.

References

Moths described in 1967
Drepaninae